Man and Machine is the eighth studio album by German heavy metal band U.D.O., released on 24 July 2002. A music video was made for "Dancing with an Angel" featuring a duet performance with Udo Dirkschneider and Warlock vocalist Doro Pesch.

Track listing

Personnel
U.D.O.
Udo Dirkschneider – vocals, producer
Stefan Kaufmann – guitar, producer, engineer, mixing
Igor Gianola – guitar
Fitty Wienhold – bass
Lorenzo Milani – drums

Additional musicians
Doro Pesch – additional vocals on "Dancing with an Angel"
Frank Knight – backing vocals on "Animal Instinct" and "The Dawn of the Gods"

Production
Manfred Melchior – mastering
Jens Rosendahl – cover art, photography
Oliver Kämper – design

References

2002 albums
U.D.O. albums
SPV/Steamhammer albums